Termeh is a type of Persian (Iranian) handwoven cloth, produced primarily in the Isfahan province. Now the Yazd Termeh is the most beautiful and famous in the world. Yazd is the center of the design, producing and marketing of Termeh. Weaving termeh requires a good wool with long fibers. Termeh is woven by an expert with the assistance of a worker called a Goushvareh-kesh. Weaving termeh is a sensitive, careful, and time-consuming process; a good weaver can produce only  in a day. The background colors used in termeh are jujube red, light red, green, orange and black. Termeh has been admired throughout history; Greek historians commented on the beauty of Persian weavings in the Achaemenian (532 B.C.), Ashkani (222 B.C.) and Sasanidae (226–641 A.D.) periods and the Chinese tourist Hoang Tesang admired termeh.

During the Safavid period (1502–1736 A.D.), zarbaf and termeh weaving techniques were significantly refined. Due to the difficulty of producing termeh and the advent of mechanized weaving, few factories remain in Iran that produce traditionally woven Termeh.

See also 

 Persian handicrafts
 The art of Kashmir shawl is inspired from Termeh.

References 

History of Asian clothing
Iranian clothing
Persian embroidery
Persian handicrafts
Persian words and phrases
Textile arts of Persia